Baux may refer to:

People
 Antonia of Baux (1355–1374), second Queen consort of Frederick III, King of Sicily
 Auguste Baux (1892–1918), French World War I flying ace credited with five aerial victories
 Barral of Baux
 Bertrand III of Baux
 Cecile of Baux (1230–1275), Countess Consort of Savoy
 Claude Baux (born 1945), French slalom canoeist
 Ercole, Marquis of Baux (1623–1651), member of the House of Grimaldi
 Francis of Baux (1330–1422), first Duke of Andria, Count of Montescaglioso
 House of Baux, French noble family from the south of France
 James of Baux (died 1383), Latin Emperor of Constantinople from 1374 to 1383
 Lords of Baux
 Margaret of Baux (1394–1469), Countess of Saint-Pol
 Marguerite Baux (1856-?), French operatic soprano
 Marquis of Baux, subsidiary title of the Prince of Monaco
 William I of Baux
 William II of Baux
 William III of Baux

Places
 Les Baux-Sainte-Croix, France
 Les Baux-de-Breteuil, France
 Les Baux-de-Provence, France

Other
 Baux score, used to prognosticate in burns